The 2022 Caerphilly County Borough Council election was held on 4 May 2022. It was part of a broader round of local elections held on the same day across Great Britain included too every local authority in Wales. The election saw the Labour Party maintain their majority in the council with little change between the parties in overall seat numbers.

Background

Previous election

Process 
The Local Government and Elections Wales Act 2021 made changes to the election system enabling 16 year olds to vote. Caerphilly County Borough launched a pilot scheme to increase voter participation, this will include being able to vote on the weekend before 5 May. A boundary review reduced the number of seats in the council from 73 to 69. Boundaries and member numbers were changed in all but six wards, Crosskeys, Hengoed, Llanbradach, St Cattwg, Ynysddu and Ystrad Mynach.

Election results

Ward results

Cwm Aber/ Aber Valley ward

Aberbargoed & Bargoed

Abercarn

Abercarn

Bedwas & Trethomas

Blackwood

Cefn Fforest & Pengam

Crosskeys

Crumlin

Darren Valley

Gilfach

Hengoed

Llanbradach

Machen and Rudry

Maesycwmmer

Morgan Jones

Moriah and Pontlottyn

Nelson

New Tredegar

Newbridge

Penmaen

Penyrheol

Pontllanfraith

Risca East

Risca West

St. Cattwg

St. Martins

Twyn Carno

Twyn Carno

Ynysddu

Ystrad Mynach

References 

Caerphilly County Borough Council elections
Caerphilly County Borough Council elections